Brixham Harbour is a harbour and fishing port situated at Brixham, Devon, England. It is home to one of the largest fishing fleets in the United Kingdom.

Description 
The port consists of an inner and an outer harbour.

Inner Harbour 
The inner harbour provides trot moorings for approximately 50 vessels, up to 35 feet in length.

Within the inner harbour there is a replica of Francis Drake's Golden Hind. The vessel is permanently moored and is used as a museum ship.

The old fish market is situated on the western side of the harbour. Nearby is the Old Market House, a Grade II listed building which is now used as a restaurant.

Outer Harbour 
The outer harbour provides deepwater swing moorings for approximately 250 vessels, up to 100 feet in length, but generally up to 70 feet in length.

References

External links 

 Harbour Map - http://www.tor-bay-harbour.co.uk/media/1008/brixhamharbourplan.png

Ports and harbours of Devon